Eastern spadefoot toads (Leptobrachium, also known as large-eyed litter frogs) comprise a genus of the family Megophryidae in the order Anura, and are found in southern China, northeast India, southeast Asia, and islands of the Sunda Shelf as well as the Philippines. They are characterized by a stocky body with slender, short hindlimbs. In identifying species, iris colour is a valuable diagnostic morphological characteristic (see Leptobrachium bompu for an example of a blue-eyed species); the iris has uniform colour in some species, whereas in other species the upper half is coloured and the lower half is dark.

The sister taxon of Leptobrachium is a clade that includes Scutiger and Oreolalax.

Subgenera
Two subgenera, Leptobrachium and Vibrissaphora, are recognized; the latter was originally described as a genus, with Vibrissaphora boringii as the type species. These subgenera (or genera) were originally separated by presence (in Vibrissaphora, hence the common name moustache or spiny toad) and absence of nuptial spines on the upper labium in males during the breeding season (in Leptobrachium). Later genetic analyses have not supported this original separation, but still indicate the presence of two distinct clades. These clades can be referred to as subgenera Leptobrachium and Vibrissaphora, but their contents differ from the earlier, purely morphological definition (Vibrissaphora contains all spiny species, but also non-spiny ones). Subgenus Vibrissaphora thus defined is distributed in southern China and Indochina, and subgenus Leptobrachium in the Malay Peninsula and the Malay Archipelago northwest of the Wallace Line. No morphological character that could uniquely separate the subgenera has yet been identified.

Species
As of mid-2019, there were 36 recognized species: and one proposed species

References

Megophryidae
 
Amphibians of Asia
Amphibian genera
Taxa named by Johann Jakob von Tschudi